Lars-Olof Johansson (born 23 February 1973, in Huskvarna, Sweden) is best known as a member of the alternative rock band  The Cardigans. Johansson's role in the band is keyboardist and guitarist. Johansson grew up in the Swedish town of Jönköping. He is also a member of acoustic/country band Up The Mountain.

References

1973 births
Living people
People from Jönköping
Swedish keyboardists
The Cardigans members
21st-century guitarists